Daryl Allan Katz (born May 31, 1961) is a Canadian billionaire businessman  and philanthropist. Katz is founder and chairman of the Katz Group of Companies, one of Canada's largest privately owned enterprises, with pharmacy, sports & entertainment, and real estate development businesses. Katz Group owns the Edmonton Oilers, and led the development of Rogers Place and the Ice District.  Katz is a former lawyer, and resides in Edmonton.

Early life
Daryl Katz was born in 1961 in Edmonton, Alberta. His father was a pharmacist who founded Value Drug Mart in Edmonton in the 1970s. Katz attended the Jewish day school, the Edmonton Talmud Torah during his elementary years and then graduated from Jasper Place High School.  He then attended the University of Alberta, graduating with an arts degree in 1982 and with a law degree in 1985.

Pharmacy business
After school, he worked for a time at the law firm, Shoctor, Mousseau and Starkman, and then started his own practice focusing on corporate and franchise law. In 1991, in a partnership with his father, Katz paid $300,000 for the Canadian rights to the U.S.-based Medicine Shoppe drugstore franchise which had over 1,000 stores in the USA. In 1992, they opened the first Medicine Shoppe store and Katz founded the Katz Group of Companies which was to become the holding company for the group. In 1996, Katz purchased the storied but fading Rexall drugstore chain in Canada which at the time, only consisted of several dozen stores. The business grew and by 1998, the Katz Group consisted of 80 Rexall stores, 30 Medicine Shoppe outlets, and a few smaller independent retailers. In 1997, he purchased the Ontario-based, 143-store Pharma Plus drug store chain from the supermarket operator Oshawa Group for $100 million. Katz reportedly retains a small circle of highly paid executives who run Katz Group. Rexall Pharmacy is run from Ontario, while other subsidiaries of Katz Group maintain private headquarters separate from Katz Group itself.

In 1999 he ventured into the U.S. with the purchase of the money-losing, $300 million in sales, Minnesota-based Snyders Drug Store chain; in 2001, he purchased the U.S.-based Drug Emporium big-box discount chain. His foray into the U.S. was not without failure: the Snyder's chain filed for bankruptcy in 2003 and its 25 stores were sold to Walgreens. In 2004, Katz purchased the naming rights for ten years to the new $45-million Rexall Centre, a 12,500-seat tennis and entertainment complex on the campus of York University. In January 2012, he sold Drug Trading Co. and Medicine Shoppe Canada to the U.S.-based drug distributor McKesson Corporation for $1.2 billion. Katz Group sold its network of approximately 460 outlets to McKesson Corporation in 2016 for C$3 billion.

Purchase of Edmonton Oilers and Creation of Oilers Entertainment Group (OEG)
In May 2007, Katz made a $145-million bid to buy the Edmonton Oilers franchise, which the owners of the team, the Edmonton Investors Group (EIG), quickly rejected, stating the team was not for sale.

In July 2007, he made another bid for the Oilers of $185-million, which EIG turned down on August 7, 2007. On December 12, 2007, Katz made an offer of $188-million to the EIG. The Board of the EIG announced in January 2008 that it would again recommend to its shareholders to reject this latest bid.

On January 28, 2008, Katz increased his offer to $200 million and extended the acceptance deadline to February 5, 2008, at which time Katz was notified by the EIG that all its members agreed to sell the Oilers to him, pending league and financial approval. On June 18, 2008, Daryl Katz received the final OK from the National Hockey League to purchase the Edmonton Oilers, and then on July 2, 2008, he was officially announced as the owner of the Edmonton Oilers during a Press Conference at Rexall Place, where he was presented with an Edmonton Oilers Jersey with the number "08" and his last name patched onto the back.

In June 2014, Katz Group announced that Bob Nicholson would join the organization as Vice-Chairman of Oilers Entertainment Group (OEG), a new sports and entertainment company that would manage the Katz Group's growing family of sports and entertainment assets, and operate Rogers Place, the new home of the Edmonton Oilers.

In addition to the Oilers, OEG owns and operates the Edmonton Oil Kings (WHL), and Bakersfield Condors (AHL) as well as Aquila Productions (film & production company). Nicholson was named CEO of OEG in April 2015 and given responsibility for both business and hockey operations.

In April 2015, Katz announced a partnership with Joel Silver to create Silver Pictures Entertainment – a new company that will develop, produce and provide or arrange financing for feature films, television and digital projects.  Katz’ interests in the company fall under the OEG umbrella. The partnership was dissolved in 2019 and Silver Pictures carried on under Hal Sadoff.

Rogers Place and Edmonton Ice District (former Arena District)
Katz has said he bought the Oilers because he saw Edmonton's need for a new arena as an opportunity to be the catalyst for the revitalization of Edmonton's downtown core.  Following public consultations and negotiations with the City of Edmonton, Katz Group and the city agreed to a public-private partnership to build Rogers Place arena, which would see the city retain ownership of the new arena, and Katz Group operate it (under OEG). The City's portion of arena funding will be paid through a Community Revitalization Levy and did not result in any new cost to taxpayers.  Construction on the project began March 2014.

Opened in September 2016, Rogers Place was marketed as one of North America's most advanced sports & entertainment venues, active year-round and featuring a 24,000 square foot grand entrance-way called the Ford Hall which can be used as public/private programmable space.

With Rogers Place at its core, Katz Group has begun construction of the Edmonton Arena District (EAD), slated to be Canada's largest mixed-use sports and entertainment development. The EAD will cover 25 contiguous acres of downtown Edmonton, and feature a 50,000 square foot public plaza, two office towers, a JW Marriott Hotel, a Gateway casino, over 1,000 luxury condos and rental apartments, and 270,000 square feet of retail space at a total cost of approximately $2.5 billion.  In 2014, it was announced that the City of Edmonton and Stantec would be the major tenants of the two respective office towers. Stantec's tower will be the tallest in Edmonton at 69 storeys.

The Edmonton Arena District was formally renamed the Ice District on July 13, 2015.

Philanthropy
In October 2006 Katz announced a $7 million donation to the University of Alberta Faculty of Pharmacy and Pharmaceutical Sciences and Faculty of Law. Matched by the province, the gift was the largest donation ever to a Canadian pharmacy school. The west wing of the Health Research Innovation Facility at the corner of 87th Avenue and 114th Street in Edmonton has been named The Katz Group Centre for Pharmacy and Health Research. In 2009 Katz donated $20 Million to Mount Sinai Hospital in Toronto and founded The Daryl A Katz Centre For Urgent And Critical Care. Katz has also given "millions" to the Stollery Children's Hospital in Edmonton, as well as supporting public events.

Between 2005 and 2010, Katz and his wife have donated "over $50 million" to organizations and institutions across Canada.

Personal life
As of November 2022, Katz' net worth is reported at US$4.2 billion, according to Forbes.

Katz is married to Renee Gouin.  She is the daughter of Jean Yvon (Ivan) Gouin. In 1952, her father founded the North American Construction Group which became one of the largest mining and heavy construction companies in Canada. The couple have twin children, Chloe and Harrison, who are the founders of the nonprofit Hockey Helps Kids organization.

In early 2017, Katz was accused by Brazilian actress and model Greice Santo and her husband R. J. Cipriani of offering money to the former in exchange for sexual favors. Santo also denounced Michael Gelmon, Katz's cousin and associate, for defending him and threatening to end her career in Hollywood if she spoke about the case.

In July 2022, Boston Ballet ballerina Dusty Button and her husband, defendants in a U.S. civil suit filed by Sage Humphries and six other ballerinas accusing the Buttons of sexual abuse, filed a counterclaim alleging that Katz paid Humpheries $75,000 in exchange for sexual favors. Humphries denied having had any sexual relationship with Katz. In August 2022, the couple voluntarily withdrew their claims against Katz; their lawyer issued an apology and requested that the court strike all relevant references from the record.

In 2019, the Oilers Entertainment Group released a statement confirming that Katz has been suffering from a life-threatening, antibiotic-resistant bacterial sinus infection. Sportsnet hockey analyst John Shannon tweeted that Katz carried an IV bag around-the-clock during Edmonton Oilers’ playoff run in 2017. He also underwent 3 surgeries in 10 months to battle the infection that has a 50-50 survival rate and his current prognosis looks positive.

References

External links
The Katz Group of Companies

1961 births
Living people
Businesspeople from Edmonton
Canadian billionaires
Canadian chief executives
Canadian investors
Canadian pharmaceutical industry businesspeople
Canadian philanthropists
Edmonton Oilers executives
Jewish Canadian philanthropists
Katz Group
Lawyers in Alberta
National Hockey League executives
National Hockey League owners
University of Alberta alumni
University of Alberta Faculty of Law alumni